Allan Thompson (27 October 1910 – 21 January 1984) was an Australian rules footballer who played for the Fitzroy Football Club in the Victorian Football League (VFL).

Notes

External links 
		

1910 births
1984 deaths
Australian rules footballers from Victoria (Australia)
Fitzroy Football Club players
Prahran Football Club players